Cambuskenneth Abbey is an Augustinian monastery located on an area of land enclosed by a meander of the River Forth near Stirling in Scotland. The abbey today is largely reduced to its foundations, however its bell tower remains. The neighbouring modern village of Cambuskenneth is named after it.

History

Establishment 
Cambuskenneth Abbey was founded by order of David I around the year 1140. It is a daughter house of the French Arrouaise Order, the only one to exist in Scotland. The Arrouaise also ran other abbeys and churches in land owned by David I in England. The Arrouaise were a distinct order at the time of the Abbey's construction to the Augustinians but the two orders would later merge.

Dedicated to the Virgin Mary, it was initially known as the Abbey of St Mary of Stirling and sometimes simply as Stirling Abbey. In 1147 Pope Eugene III declared the Abbey had his protection through a papal bull, a status confirmed by both Pope Alexander III in 1164 and Pope Celestine III in 1195. The abbey becomes known as Cambuskenneth rather than Stirling from around 1207 as shown by papal bulls of the time.

Cambuskenneth was one of the more important abbeys in Scotland, due in part to its proximity to the Royal Burgh of Stirling, a leading urban centre of the country and sometime capital. The establishment of abbeys in Scotland, including Cambuskenneth, under David I provided a new influence in Scottish public life by providing sources of literate individuals for the royal court and administrative duties.

14th century and connections to Bruce kings 
Its status as a royal abbey in the neighbourhood of a major national stronghold may be compared to that of Holyrood Abbey vis-à-vis Edinburgh. Notable events include in 1303 Edward I of England prayed and received an oath of loyalty from Robert Wishart, Bishop of Glasgow, at the Abbey. In 1308 Niall mac Cailein, Gilbert II de la Hay and other nobles swore allegiance to Robert the Bruce. The connection to Robert the Bruce continues with a parliament being held at the abbey in 1314, five months after victory at the Battle of Bannockburn. The spoils of the Battle at Bannockburn were shared out on the grounds of the abbey. In 1326 another parliament was held where nobles and clergy swore an oath to the king and confirm the succession of his son David II. So frequently was the abbey used for Parliaments during the 14th century that one of the connected buildings on the site became known as "Parliament Hall".The abbey continued to have close links to the heirs of Robert the Bruce, Robert II granted charters at the abbey in 1380 and accounts show that he stayed at the site for a number of days, while his son Robert III conducted royal business at the abbey in 1392.

In 1486 Margaret of Denmark died at Stirling Castle and was buried at the abbey. In 1488 her husband, James III was killed at the Battle of Sauchieburn and his body was brought to Cambuskenneth Abbey for burial. His tomb was finished in 1502 and painted by David Pratt. Following the dismantling of the bulk of the abbey the tomb was damaged and it was restored in 1865, funded by Queen Victoria. It stands within a railed enclosure at the east end of the abbey ruins.

Later history and closure 
Patrick Paniter became the Abbot of Cambuskenneth in 1513, he is the most notable individual to hold the title as he also held the position of secretary to James V and also fought at the Battle of Flodden in the same year.

The abbey fell into disuse during the Scottish Reformation. In 1560 the abbey was placed under the jurisdiction of the military governor of Stirling Castle, John Erskine, who had much of the stonework removed and used in construction projects in the castle. His nephew Adam Erskine was made Commendator of the Abbey. Abbey Craig, on which the Wallace Monument sits, is named such because of its siting near Cambuskenneth Abbey.

Abbey today 
The abbey was acquired by the crown in 1908, and it is managed by Historic Scotland. The abbey is open to visitors during the summer months. The foundations of the abbey church and other ancillary buildings are visible on the site, much of which date from around the 13th century. Only the 13th-century campanile is intact, following an extensive renovation in 1859. There is also a historic graveyard on the site including the grave of James III of Scotland and his wife Margaret of Denmark, as well as many of the Abbots of Cambuskenneth.

See also
 Abbeys and priories in Scotland

References

External links
 Video footage and history of Cambuskenneth Abbey

Christian monasteries established in the 12th century
Ruins in Stirling (council area)
Augustinian monasteries in Scotland
Category A listed buildings in Stirling (council area)
Listed monasteries in Scotland
Scheduled Ancient Monuments in Stirling
Bell towers in the United Kingdom
Museums in Stirling (council area)
Religious museums in Scotland
Scottish parliamentary locations and buildings
Ruined abbeys and monasteries
1140 establishments in Scotland
Former Christian monasteries in Scotland